Great Northern Railway Class P were two sets of 4-4-0 locomotives for the Great Northern Railway of Ireland (GNRI) introduced from 1892 by locomotive superintendent J.C. Park; four having  driving wheels and eight having   driving wheels.  Park was succeeded by Charles Clifford who constructed 17 broadly similar locomotives from 1896 with  driving wheels; these were designated Class PP. The last PP class survived until 1963.

Notes

References

 
 

4-4-0 locomotives
Railway locomotives introduced in 1892
5 ft 3 in gauge locomotives
Steam locomotives of Northern Ireland
Steam locomotives of Ireland
P
Scrapped locomotives